Iron Man 2 is an action-adventure video game loosely based on the film of the same name. It was released in Europe on April 30, 2010, and in North America on May 4 for Xbox 360, Nintendo DS, Wii, PlayStation 3, and PlayStation Portable. Published by Sega, the game was developed by Sega Studios San Francisco  for PlayStation 3 and Xbox 360, Griptonite Games for Nintendo DS, High Voltage Software for Wii and PlayStation Portable, and by Gameloft for iOS (released on May 3) and BlackBerry PlayBook (released on August 25). A Microsoft Windows version was planned, but was cancelled.

The game has an original story written by The Invincible Iron Man author, Matt Fraction. This story is set after the plot of the film, although the iOS and BlackBerry versions stick roughly to the film's plot. The game features the voices of Don Cheadle and Samuel L. Jackson, reprising their roles from the film.

Gameplay
Players can play as either Iron Man or War Machine, each with their own unique style. While Iron Man is sleeker and relies much more on energy weapons, War Machine is outfitted with ballistic weaponry and tougher armor. Iron Man can choose from multiple suits of armour, including Marks II through VI. Players can customize upgrades and weaponry on the armor. Weapons can also be switched during gameplay. Flight control has been improved upon since the first game, as has melee combat, allowing players to get near to the ground. AI was also updated from the previous title. New enemies have been included, and new strategies are now available in combat.

In the Wii/PlayStation Portable version, simplified graphics, different combat systems (not using melee during midair) and different missions are added. Flying across levels was removed, instead letting Iron Man hover or walk across the level. The point of view was also changed. Also included are "Tech Trophies", collectibles which can be used as upgrades, while "Ammo Cases" are used to supply ammunition.

Synopsis
The game begins with Iron Man (voiced by Eric Loomis) defending the Dataspine, an archived version of J.A.R.V.I.S. (Andrew Chaikin), from attackers. However, an EMP bomb is dropped, disabling him. Three hours earlier, Tony Stark had recorded a journal message in which he mentions the Roxxon Energy Corporation, and how they tried to duplicate the Iron Man armor without success. Tony is then interrupted by James "Rhodey" Rhodes (Don Cheadle), who says that there is trouble at Stark Archives. Following the EMP bomb, the power reserves in Iron Man's armor activate, and upon recovering, Iron Man learns that Roxxon is behind the attack. He grimly decides that he should destroy the Dataspine to keep Roxxon from getting the archives. Outside, Rhodey, in his War Machine armor, intercepts some Roxxon Dropships.

Iron Man makes contact with S.H.I.E.L.D. director Nick Fury (Samuel L. Jackson), who informs him that separatists under the command of a General Shatalov (Dimitri Diatchenko) have seized control of a Tesla facility. During Iron Man's escort of S.H.I.E.L.D. helicopter forces, they are attacked by a battle platform called the Roxxon Armiger. After destroying it, Iron Man and War Machine head to a battlecruiser and destroy it, learning the Armiger was remote-controlled. They discover that Shatalov is working with the terrorist group Advanced Idea Mechanics to create the Crimson Dynamo suit. Upon learning that the suit is being developed at a power plant in Siberia, Fury reveals that he has sent Natasha Romanoff (Catherine Campion), the Black Widow, to spy on the plant.

At the plant, Shatalov makes contact with A.I.M.'s Kearson DeWitt (Doug Boyd), who tells him that there is a spy in his ranks, displeased that he has brought S.H.I.E.L.D. to their front door. Shatalov gives orders to prep the Crimson Dynamo armor and then informs his men that their connection with A.I.M. is now severed. Iron Man finds and protects Natasha from Shatalov's men and a S.H.I.E.L.D. transport is sent to their location. Natasha is extracted while Iron Man and War Machine battle Shatalov in his Crimson Dynamo armor. The defeated Shatalov reveals that A.I.M. was behind the theft of J.A.R.V.I.S.'s AI, and are planning to use it to create Ultimo.

The team learns that Kearson DeWitt was behind the attack led by Shatalov and that he had previously worked at Stark's Theoretical Weapons Division until Stark shut it down. Aside from DeWitt working on the prototype of the arc reactor, Pepper Potts (Meredith Monroe) also reveals that he had a secret project called PROTEAN. Inside an A.I.M. base, DeWitt uses his PROTEAN technology to merge with an enormous metal suit and become Ultimo. With the merge complete, DeWitt has his men upgraded with PROTEAN implants. Arriving at the base, War Machine battles PROTEAN drones while Iron Man searches for DeWitt. J.A.R.V.I.S. detects Ultimo shortly after the base is secured with help from S.H.I.E.L.D.

Meanwhile, the S.H.I.E.L.D. helicarrier is attacked, and Iron Man protects it from DeWitt's drones. When War Machine defeats an Arc Armiger dropped on the helicarrier, Iron Man decides to reprogram it. Using the reprogrammed Armiger, Iron Man and War Machine assault an A.I.M. base in Malaysia. When the giant Ultimo arrives, War Machine disables some of its arc reactors while Iron Man fights the DeWitt/Ultimo within. Upon defeating DeWitt/Ultimo, Iron Man learns that the effects on DeWitt are irreversible. War Machine finishes Ultimo off while the helicarrier rams it. Afterward, J.A.R.V.I.S. tells Stark to promise him never to let anyone gain access to his programming again.

Development

Iron Man 2 was written by The Invincible Iron Man scribe Matt Fraction and Sega creative director Kyle Brink, with additional writing by Sega writer Phil Campbell and Sega associate producer Stephen Frost. The game features an exclusive song recorded by Lamb of God, "Hit the Wall", along with a soundtrack composed by other bands.

Audio
Unlike the original Iron Man video game, Robert Downey, Jr. does not voice Iron Man, who is instead voiced by Eric Loomis (who would go on to play the character in The Avengers: Earth's Mightiest Heroes animated series and the video game Marvel vs. Capcom 3: Fate of Two Worlds/Ultimate Marvel vs. Capcom 3). Don Cheadle and Samuel L. Jackson reprise their roles as War Machine and Nick Fury, respectively. Cheadle and Jackson are the only actors from the film to return to voice their video game counterparts. Veteran voice actors Steven Blum and Phil LaMarr also lend their talent, with Steven Blum voicing the characters Mauler and Ghost, while Phil LaMarr provides additional dialogue for War Machine. Veteran animator Eric Goldberg voiced A.I.M. soldiers. John Eric Bentley also provided additional dialogue for Nick Fury.

Reception

The game received generally unfavorable reviews, with Metacritic scores of 44 and 45 out of 100 for the PlayStation 3 and Xbox 360 versions, respectively. There is division among critics as to whether or not the game is an improvement over its predecessor. IGN gave a score of 5.1 for the PS3 and Xbox 360 version, 5.5 for the Wii version and 4.9 for the PSP version. They felt the game was an improvement upon the original, but still did not quite hit the mark, citing poor graphics, a five-hour playing time, repetitive dodging and action, and a lack of challenge, which made the upgrade system unnecessary; "Iron Man 2 isn't terrible, but it rarely gets exciting. It's fun to blow up tanks and trucks, and Iron Man has all his powers like his repulsor shots and his unibeam laser. But the whole game feels repetitive. You see the same enemies over and over again, and even though they get bigger guns and more armor as you go, the gameplay stays the same. The PSP version features even fewer guys than the Wii game, so a lot of times areas just seem empty because there aren't artillery trucks rolling up and dumping out bad guys".

Michael Lafferty from GameZone gave it a 4.5, suggesting that players should "watch the movie, read the comic book, but pass on the game". GameSpot also gave it a 4.5, arguing that "every decent element is overshadowed by stumbles and shortcomings. It should be thrilling and fun to take to the sky in a superpowered battle suit, but Iron Man 2 crashes to the Earth with a dull thud". Empire magazine gave it one star, calling it a "rare failure for Sega", and stating that the experience felt like an early PlayStation 1 game.

References

External links
 

2010 video games
Action video games
BlackBerry games
Video games based on Iron Man
Nintendo DS games
PlayStation 3 games
PlayStation Portable games
Cancelled Windows games
Sega video games
Marvel Cinematic Universe video games
Video games based on films
Video games based on adaptations
Video games developed in France
Video games developed in the United States
Video games set in Hungary
Video games set in Malaysia
Video games set in Russia
Wii games
IOS games
Xbox 360 games
High Voltage Software games
Single-player video games
Superhero video games
Iron Man (film series)
Gameloft games